Paliwal is an Indian toponymic surname from Pali, Rajasthan. Notable people bearing the name include:

Dinesh Paliwal (born 1957), Indian businessman
Ila Paliwal, Indian musician
Madan Paliwal (born 1959), Indian business magnate, investor, and philanthropist
Pramod Paliwal (born 1968), Indian author and professor
Rajat Paliwal (born 1991), Indian cricketer
Srikrishna Dutt Paliwal (1898–1968), Indian politician
Shivani Paliwal (born 2002), Indian pop singer
Shyam Sunder Paliwal (born 1964), Indian social activist
Suraj Paliwal (born 1951), Indian professor and author
Tika Ram Paliwal (1909–1995), Indian politician

 

Indian surnames
Surnames of Indian origin
Surnames of Hindustani origin
Toponymic surnames
Hindu surnames
People from Pali district